Rottenburg Cathedral, also known as St. Martin's Cathedral, is a Roman Catholic cathedral in Rottenburg am Neckar, Germany dedicated to Martin of Tours. It is the seat of the Diocese of Rottenburg-Stuttgart.

History

A chapel was built here in 1280; the parish church of the village of Sülchen was established before the village was incorporated into the city, and was dedicated to St Martin. A fire in 1644 was followed by a fundamental reconstruction which was completed on 8 September 1655. The reconstruction made the building into a Baroque church, the pillars were strengthened and the vault was repaired. The asymmetric plan was preserved.

Known in German as Dom St. Martin it has been the city's cathedral since 1821. Its tower, dating from 1486, is its most prominent feature.

Fittings

Organ

Main

Choir

Bells

Notes

Citations

References
 Wolfgang Sannwald, Geschichtszüge, .
 Dieter Manz, Rottenburger Miniaturen, hrsg. von der Stadt Rottenburg, 1991.
 Dieter Manz, Der Dom in Rottenburg a. N. 1. Aufl. 2007.
 Harald Kiebler (ed.) Glanz von Glaube und Frömmigkeit - Der Domschatz von Rottenburg 2011, Kunstverlag Josef Fink, 340 S.
 Harald Kiebler, Die Glocken des Rottenburger Doms St. Martin 2009, 42 S. (erhältlich im Dompfarramt St. Martin, 72108 Rottenburg, Marktplatz 3).
 Werner Groß (ed.) Wo Kirche sich versammelt, Der Dom St. Martin zu Rottenburg in Geschichte und Gegenwart 2003, .

External links 

 Official site
 Choir school
 The full chime of the cathedral bells (audio)

Roman Catholic cathedrals in Baden-Württemberg
Buildings and structures in Tübingen (district)